MTN Hitmaker is a television music competition created by MTN Ghana in 2011. The show is available to all amateur musicians living in Ghana or who are habitually residing in Ghana. Since its inception in 2012, the competition has fostered and injected several music talents into the public. Some of these artists include Kwame Eugene, Kidi, Fameye and Mr Drew.

Format

Auditions 
Every year's competition begins with a series of audition stages, the first of which, termed "Scouting," is guided by some of Ghana's beatmakers who are experienced in all music genre. This stage is open to all types of music performed by independent groups, and it chooses who will compete. The judges in charge of that year's event attend these, which are hosted in a public setting in selected cities across the country. Each participant who makes it to the next stage of the auditions is sent to a waiting room offstage from the main performance area and given a number that indicates when they will perform. Contestants are given two chances to perform for the panel before being judged solely on their delivery.

Live Rounds 
After the format's inception and later alteration to match other reality shows, participants who pass their auditions and achieve a place in the live rounds of the competitions are allocated to beatmakers and compete against each other to secure a position in the live final of the competition. The competition's live episodes are staged in a specific location within the country, with live episodes for each season shown weekly on the TV3 network. The layout of the live rounds changes yearly by this stage of the competition, but it is more often organized as quarter-finals, semi-finals, and the final itself - earlier seasons differed, with the finals sometimes being separated into different rounds.

Those who advance to the season's final compete for the most public votes, with the number of finalists varying from season to season - later seasons allow each finalist to perform more than once, and also perform in groups. The winning artist with the most votes and the highest judges score is declared the winner and receives a monetary award together with a record deal.

Judges and Hosts

Season synopses

References 

Talent shows
Music competitions
TV3 Ghana original programming